Joint Army–Navy Assessment Committee (JANAC) was a United States inter-service agency set up to analyze and assess Japanese naval and merchant marine shipping losses caused by U.S. and Allied forces during World War II.

Background
In January 1943, JANAC was formed by General George Marshall, the Chief of Staff of the U.S. Army, and Admiral Ernest J. King, the Chief of Naval Operations and Commander-in-Chief, United States Fleet (COMINCH), to assess enemy naval and merchant shipping losses during World War II.  The objectives of JANAC were as set forth in the following joint Army–Navy directive:

JANAC consisted of representatives of the U.S. Navy, the U.S. Army, and the Army Air Forces, with a joint Army–Navy secretariat, under the chairmanship of Rear Admiral Walter S. DeLany.  Following the war, Rear Admiral Jerauld Wright succeeded Delany as JANAC chairman.

Methodology & Results
JANAC used the following sources to compile information on Japanese vessel losses during World War II:

 Prisoner of War Reports
 Captured Enemy Documents
 United States and Allied Intelligence Sources
 Naval Shipping Control Authority for Japanese Merchant Marine (SCAJAP)
 Ariyoshi's Final List (Japanese)
 Ariyoshi's List (Japanese)
 Shipowners' List (Japanese)
 Naval Ministry List (Japanese)
 United States Mine Warfare Report
 United States and Allied Action Summaries
 United States Photographic Intelligence
 United States Strategic Bombing Survey (USSBS) Reports

The assessment of losses, unanimously agreed to by all JANAC members of the committee, was published in 1947, which included:

 All Naval vessels known or believed to have been lost.
 All merchant vessels of 500 or more gross tons known or believed to have been lost.

JANAC provided a detailed chronology of Japanese naval and merchant marine losses cross-indexed in the appendix of its final report, including a separate summary about losses caused by U.S. submarines.  JANAC noted that a negligible number of vessels were not assessed because of insufficient information as to the cause of loss.

Legacy

Submarine service
JANAC significantly altered wartime estimates for Japanese losses inflicted by the U.S. Navy's submarine service. At the end of World War II, Vice Admiral Charles A. Lockwood and his COMSUBPAC staff had estimated that approximately 4,000 ships had been sunk, totalling 10 million tons lost. JANAC revised this total to 1,314 enemy vessels and 5.3 million tons sunk.  JANAC estimates of Japanese losses revised wartime claims downward for most war patrols carried out by the submarine service during World War II as noted in the following table of the revised list of top ten submarines based upon the total tonnage sunk as determined by JANAC.

JANAC also revised the achievements of individual submarine commanding officers as noted in the following table.

Although JANAC tended to revise downward wartime estimates, one noteworthy exception involved the fifth war patrol of Archerfish (SS-311) under the command of Commander Joseph F. Enright.  Archerfish was credited with sinking a 24,000-ton Hiyō-class aircraft carrier during the war, but JANAC determined he had actually sunk the 66,000-ton carrier Shinano, making this the most successful submarine patrol of the Pacific War.

Battle of Midway
JANAC also addressed wartime claims made by the U.S. Army Air Force regarding the sinking of the Japanese aircraft carriers Kaga, Akagi, Hiryū, and Sōryū during the Battle of Midway by giving sole credit to the U.S. Navy.

See also

 Allied submarines in the Pacific War
 Strategic Bombing Survey

Notes

Bibliography

Primary Sources
 
 Special Research History – Navy Department Library – Naval Historical Center:
 SRH-163 - Joint Army–Navy Assessment Committee (JANAC), Miscellaneous Memoranda, 1943–1947
 SRH-164 - Memoranda from COMINCH, (F-20) to Joint Army–Navy Assessment Committee (JANAC), 1944–1945
 SRH-165 - Memoranda from Office of Naval Communications to Joint Army–Navy Assessment Committee (JANAC), 1943–1944
 SRH-166 - Joint Army–Navy Assessment Committee (JANAC), Memoranda to Office of Naval Communication
 SRH-167 - Memoranda from Army Signal Corps to Joint Army–Navy Assessment Committee (JANAC), 1945–1946
 SRH-168 - Agenda Minutes/Assessments, Joint Army–Navy Assessment Committee (JANAC)

Secondary Sources
 Clay Blair Jr. Silent Victory: The U.S. Submarine War Against Japan (Philadelphia: Lippincott, 1975)  (Paperback)
 David M. Key Jr. Admiral Jerauld Wright: Warrior among Diplomats (Manhattan, Kansas: Sunflower University Press, 2001)

External links
 JANAC report
 Japanese Naval and Merchant Vessels Sunk During WWII By All U.S. Submarines - Valor at Sea: The U.S. Submarine War in the Pacific War 1941–1945
 Ships and Tonnage Sunk or Damaged in WW II by U.S. Submarines - Pigboats.com
 "Results of the German and American Submarine Campaigns of World War II" by Commander Michel Thomas Poirier, U.S. Navy (20 October 1999) - Chief of Naval Operations - Submarine Warfare Division
 Top Ten US Navy Submarine Captains in WW2 By Number of Confirmed Ships Sunk

Intelligence services of World War II
Pacific theatre of World War II
Joint committees